The Battle of Jowhar was a battle in the 2006 Somali War fought between the Islamic Courts Union (ICU) and affiliated militias against Ethiopian and Transitional Federal Government (TFG) forces for control of the town of Jowhar (located at ). It began on December 27, 2006, when retreating ICU forces regrouped near their stronghold of Jowhar. It became the last major town and strategic stronghold of the ICU to fall to Ethiopian and TFG forces before the latter overtook Mogadishu two days later.

Background 
After failing to contain the TFG/Ethiopian push in the Battle of Baidoa, the ICU had gone into what it called a "tactical retreat", pulling from the front lines towards Mogadishu. Jowhar, a major city which had been taken from the ARPCT in June, had become a stronghold of the ICU and was where many had retreated to. Hundreds of civilian refugees fled Jowhar in anticipation of the fighting, adding to humanitarian concerns created by floods, hunger and disease.

Battle 

Reports from Jowhar said that fighting began on December 27 in the town of Jimbale. Islamist fighters used irrigation canals as fortifications in defending the town in a bid to halt a general retreat. It was reported to be taken by Ethiopian/TFG forces in a dawn attack, using artillery, mortars and heavy machine guns. Former warlord and past ruler of Jowhar, Mohammed Dheere, led the assault.

At 10:00am, ICU forces were reported pulling out of town. At 10:30am, witnesses reported seeing heavily armed Ethiopian troops with tanks entering the former ICU stronghold. Casualties are unknown at this time. Some reports say that ICU soldiers left without putting up a fight. According to one witness, ICU troops later retreated from the town before Ethiopian troops could advance.

However, fighting could still be heard at a military camp south of Jowhar.

Aftermath

The loss of Jowhar led the ICU to retreat further to Balad in middle Shabelle province, a town 30 kilometres away from Mogadishu. This created chaos in the town, according to some sources, including looting.

Returning warlord Dheere, purportedly wearing an "I Love Jowhar" T-shirt told the crowd gathered after the battle, "We will attack Mogadishu tomorrow, from two directions." He was referring to the advance taking place on the main road between Baidoa and Mogadishu, where sounds of battle could still be heard at the village of Leego. Fighting was also reported at a military camp south of Jowhar.

After the battle in Jowhar, thousands of Ethiopian and government-allied Somali troops, accompanied by tanks, continued south towards Balad, the next major town on the road to the capital (30 km, 18 miles north of Mogadishu). They were reported passing through Qalimow village (40 km, 25 miles north of Balad) by a local resident. Later in the day, they were reported occupying Balad, where the column halted to avoid causing civilian casualties in Mogadishu.

See also
Somalia War (2006–2009)

References

External links
Jowhar Map

2006 in Ethiopia
2006 in Somalia
Conflicts in 2006
Battles involving Somalia
Battles involving Ethiopia
Battles of the Somalia War (2006–2009)
December 2006 events in Africa